Nocturnal Koreans is a mini-album and the fifteenth studio album by British post-punk band Wire. It was released on 22 April 2016 through the band's own Pinkflag label.

Background
The album grew out of tracks initially recorded for Wire’s self-titled 2015 album. At that time, the band had recorded a total of 19 tracks, 11 of which were selected for WIRE.

In a press release for the album, however, guitarist and singer Colin Newman, drew a distinction between the material selected for WIRE and that for Nocturnal Koreans:  “The WIRE album was quite respectful of the band, and Nocturnal Koreans is less respectful of the band—or, more accurately, it’s the band being less respectful to itself—in that it’s more created in the studio, rather than recorded basically as the band played it, which was mostly the case with WIRE. A general rule for this record was: any trickery is fair game, if it makes it sound better.”

Accolades
On 21 April 2016, Stereogum named Nocturnal Koreans their album of the week.

Track listing

Personnel
Adapted from the album liner notes.

Wire
Colin Newman – vocals [1-7], electric guitar [1-8], baritone electric guitar [3], acoustic guitar [2, 5, 7], keyboards [1-8], mandola [7], beatbox [1], production, engineering, mixing   
Graham Lewis – bass guitar [1-3, 5-8], vocals [3, 4, 8], MS-10 [3, 5], loops [8], inside photography
Robert Grey – drums [1-3, 5- 8], glass [4], percussion [8]
Matthew Simms – electric guitar [1-8], lap steel guitar [1, 2, 4], acoustic guitar [2], trumpet [2], modular synth [5], piano [8], fx [4]   
Production
Sean Douglas – engineering 
Denis Blackham – mastering
Jon Wozencroft – art direction, photography

Charts

See also
List of 2016 albums

References

External links

Wire (band) albums
2016 albums
Albums recorded at Rockfield Studios